The 2020 United States presidential election in North Carolina was held on Tuesday, November 3, 2020, as part of the 2020 United States presidential election in which all 50 states plus the District of Columbia participated. North Carolina voters chose electors to represent them in the Electoral College via a popular vote. The state was narrowly won by the Republican Party's nominee, incumbent President Donald Trump of Florida, and running mate Vice President Mike Pence of Indiana against Democratic Party nominee, former Vice President Joe Biden of Delaware, and his running mate California Senator Kamala Harris. North Carolina has 15 electoral votes in the Electoral College.

Polls of the state throughout the campaign indicated a close race, with most organizations considering it either a tossup or leaning towards Biden. Despite this, Trump ultimately won North Carolina by a 1.34% margin over Biden, making him only the second Republican incumbent ever to carry North Carolina and lose re-election after George H. W. Bush. This was Trump's narrowest victory in any state, and was a closer result than his 3.67% margin over Hillary Clinton in 2016 and Mitt Romney's 2.04% margin over Barack Obama in 2012. North Carolina was the only state in the 2020 election in which Donald Trump won with under 50% of the vote. In the 2020 election, North Carolina was 5.8% right of the nation as a whole. The state last voted Democratic in 2008 and furthermore, it had last voted more Republican than neighboring Georgia in 2000.

The rural-urban divide was even more prevalent this election than in past elections. Biden carried eight of North Carolina's ten largest counties (losing only the Charlotte-area suburban counties of Union and Gaston), and overperformed Obama's 2008 margin in the six largest: Wake, Mecklenburg, Guilford, Forsyth, Durham, and Buncombe, in which he received 62%, 67%, 61%, 56%, 80%, and 60% of the vote, respectively. Biden furthermore became the first Democrat to carry New Hanover County, home of Wilmington, since 1976, and held Trump to a single-digit margin in the Charlotte-area suburban county of Cabarrus, the first time since 1976 that the Republican margin in this county has been less than 10%.

Conversely, Trump held or outperformed his 2016 margin in Robeson, Bladen, Martin, Granville and Gates counties, all counties that had been reliably Democratic in the 20th century and which had voted for Obama twice before flipping to Trump in 2016. Biden thereby became the first Democrat ever to win the presidency without Robeson County, the largest county in the Lumber River region of the state and the county which had given Jimmy Carter his largest raw vote margin in the state in both 1976 and 1980. Trump picked off neighboring Scotland County, one of only 15 counties he flipped nationally, becoming the first Republican to carry it since Ronald Reagan in 1984 and making Biden the first Democrat to win without Scotland since the county's creation in 1899. Biden also became the first Democrat to win the White House without Granville and Gates counties since Grover Cleveland in 1892, the first since Cleveland in 1884 to win without Bladen County, the first since James Buchanan in 1856 to win without Richmond County and the first ever to win without Martin County.

Trump's victory was, alongside his victory (and actual improvement over 2016) in Florida, one of the upsets of the cycle. Election data website FiveThirtyEight's election forecast had Biden up in both states, albeit by small margins. Similarly, prediction websites Inside Elections, Sabato Crystal Ball, The Economist, and ABC News all had Biden favored in the state.

Primary elections
Presidential preference primaries were held on March 3, 2020 (First cases of COVID-19), for each of the political parties with state ballot access.

Democratic primary

Despite speculation that he might seek the Democratic nomination, Roy Cooper, the Governor of North Carolina, declined to run.

Republican primary

The North Carolina Republican Party submitted to the state only the name of incumbent President Donald Trump to be listed on the primary ballot. The campaign of Bill Weld "has written to the [state Board of Elections] asking to be added to the ballot, arguing that his candidacy meets the legal test because he’s received 'widespread news coverage,' raised more than $1.2 million, and has qualified for the primary ballot in six other states," according to the News and Observer. Joe Walsh similarly petitioned the state board of elections. On Dec. 20, 2019, the state board unanimously voted to include both Weld and Walsh on the ballot.

Libertarian primary

Green primary

Constitution primary

General election

Predictions

Polling
Graphical summary

Aggregate polls

June 1 – October 31, 2020

January 1, 2020 – May 31, 2020

January 1, 2018 – December 31, 2019

Donald Trump vs. Michael Bloomberg

Donald Trump vs. Cory Booker

Donald Trump vs. Pete Buttigieg

Donald Trump vs. Kirsten Gillibrand

Donald Trump vs. Kamala Harris

Donald Trump vs. Amy Klobuchar

Donald Trump vs. Beto O'Rourke

Donald Trump vs. Bernie Sanders

Donald Trump vs. Elizabeth Warren

with Donald Trump and Michelle Obama

with Donald Trump and Oprah Winfrey

with Donald Trump and a person whose name was randomly chosen out of a phone book

with Donald Trump and Roy Cooper

with Donald Trump and Generic Democrat

with Donald Trump and Generic Opponent

Results

Results by county

Counties that flipped from Republican to Democratic
New Hanover County (largest municipality: Wilmington)
Nash County (largest municipality: Rocky Mount)

Counties that flipped from Democratic to Republican
Scotland County (largest municipality: Laurinburg)

Results by congressional district
Trump won 8 of 13 congressional districts.

See also
 United States presidential elections in North Carolina
 2020 North Carolina elections
 2020 United States presidential election
 2020 Democratic Party presidential primaries
 2020 Republican Party presidential primaries
 2020 Libertarian Party presidential primaries
 2020 Green Party presidential primaries
 2020 United States elections

Notes
General footnotes

Partisan clients

References

Further reading
 
 
 . (Describes bellwether New Hanover County, North Carolina)

External links
  (State affiliate of the U.S. League of Women Voters)
 
 
 

North Carolina
2020
Presidential